Chickasaw is an unincorporated community in Madison Township, Armstrong County, Pennsylvania, United States.

History
A post office called Chickasaw was established in 1912, and remained in operation until 1931.

References 

Unincorporated communities in Armstrong County, Pennsylvania
Unincorporated communities in Pennsylvania